Ocimum campechianum is a plant species in the family Lamiaceae, widespread across Mexico, Central America, South America, the West Indies, and Florida.

Leaves of Ocimum campechianum are eaten in Brazil's Amazon jungle. Similar to basil, it has a pungent flavor and contains essential oils which have been used ethnomedicinally. In Amazonia, the aromatic leaves are used as an admixture in ayahuasca brews. The plant is known as albahaca in Mexico and called xkakaltun in Mexico's Yucatan Peninsula, where it is considered a honey plant and is used as an abortifacient.

Essential oil
Essential oil from O. campechianum has been tested for its in vitro food-related biological activities and found comparable to the essential oils of common basil and thyme and superior in its capacity as an antioxidant. It has also been found to possess antifungal activity against food spoiling yeasts. The leaves have the highest concentration of essential oil (4.3%). Multiple chemotypes exist within the species and can be distinguished by analyzing the essential oil by gas chromatography (GC) and/or GC isotope ratio mass spectrometry.

References

campechianum
Flora of South America
Flora of Mexico
Plants described in 1768
Flora of the Caribbean
Medicinal plants
Edible plants
Taxa named by Philip Miller
Flora of Central America
Flora of Florida
Flora without expected TNC conservation status